Drackenorth or Drakenorth is a prominent hill,  high, 3 km NNE of Powerstock on the Jubilee Trail in the county of Dorset in southern England. Its prominence of  means it is listed as one of the Tumps. It is located within the Dorset Downs.

The summit is the highest point on a southwest-to-northeast running ridge and is relatively open with woods on the steep slopes to the south and east. The Jubilee Trail runs up the northeast spur and passes north of the summit before diving into Woodlands Coppice.

References 

Hills of Dorset